Patrick Samuel Jones (born 9 June 2003) is a Welsh professional footballer who plays for Huddersfield Town as a winger. He has also represented Wales at under-21 international level.

Career
Born in Stockport, England, Jones started his football career at his local team Ruthin Town, before moving to Bala Town and then Wrexham in 2017. He joined the Huddersfield Town Academy in September 2019, before signing a professional contract in October 2020. Because the transfer was across the England–Wales border, Jones had to wait for international clearance before joining the club, which came in January 2020.

Jones made his senior debut for Huddersfield Town on 9 January 2021, starting in their 3–2 FA Cup Third Round defeat to Plymouth Argyle, before being replaced by Rolando Aarons.

He scored his first goal for Huddersfield against Norwich City on 16 August 2022.

International
Jones has played for Wales' Under-17 side.

In June 2022, Jones played twice for the Wales U21 team in UEFA European Under-21 Championship qualification matches against Netherlands U21 and Gibraltar U21.

Career statistics

References

2003 births
Living people
Footballers from Stockport
Welsh footballers
Wales youth international footballers
Wales under-21 international footballers
English people of Welsh descent
Huddersfield Town A.F.C. players
Association football midfielders
English Football League players
Ruthin Town F.C. players
Bala Town F.C. players
Wrexham A.F.C. players